Undine is a 1916 American silent fantasy drama film which featured the athletic actress Ida Schnall in a water-themed story based upon the fairy tale Undine by Friedrich de la Motte Fouque. The film was directed by Henry Otto and produced and distributed by the Bluebird Photoplays division of Universal Film Manufacturing Company. It is not known whether the film currently survives.

Plot
As described in a film review, a father reads the story of Undine to his girl from a book. Undine (Schnall) the first is the cleverest of the water nymphs under Queen Unda, mistress of the underseas. Undine is always the leader in all feats of daring and outdives and outswims all of her companions. The revels of the nymphs on land and shore are clearly shown. But Undine falls in love with Waldo (Nelson), a mortal, and leaves her companions to live in happiness at the edge of the sea. One day Waldo goes into the enchanted forest and slays a sacred deer, and in revenge Kuhleborn (Zerr), ruler of the forest, slays him. Undine the first dies of grief on the beach, and when she is found by her companions they discover that there has been born Undine the second. As punishment for the crime the mother has committed, Undine the second is destined to live among mortals until a pure love shall atone for the sin. The young child of simple fisherfolk is stolen by the nymphs and made to roam the enchanted forest, while Undine the second is left where the bereft mother will find her and rear her as her own. In later years Huldbrand (Gerrard), a suitor for the hand of the Lady Berthelda (Maison), who is actually the daughter of the fisherfolk and raised by the duke and duchess, ventures into the enchanted forest. He is seen by Kuhleborn drinking from a fountain, which designates him as the one that shall seek out Undine and marry her. An enchantment is placed on the knight, and he discovers her and marries her. On his taking her back to the castle, Kuhleborn again appears and, declaring Undine's mission among the mortals on earth has been served, sends her back to the sea by his enchantment.

Cast
Ida Schnall as Undine 
Douglas Gerrard as Huldbrand
Edna Maison as Lady Berthelda 
Carol Stellson as the duke
Caroline Fowler as the duchess
O. C. Jackson as the fisherman
Josephine Rice as the fisherman’s wife
Elijah Zerr as Kuhleborn
Jack Nelson as Waldo
Thomas Delmer as Father Heilmann 
Eileen Allen
Grace Astor

Production
Location scenes of Undine were filmed at Santa Cruz Island, one of the Channel Islands of California.

Reception
One critic suggested that a better title would have been Undressed due to Schnall's lack of clothing in the film. Another stated, "No one really cared much about the plot of Undine: It was enough that sylphlike Ida Schnall showed up from time to time in various stages of near nudity."

Lobby cards

References

External links

1916 films
American silent feature films
Universal Pictures films
1910s fantasy drama films
American fantasy drama films
Works based on Undine (novella)
American black-and-white films
Films based on German novels
Films shot in California
1916 drama films
Films directed by Henry Otto
1910s American films
Silent American drama films
1910s English-language films